Singa The Courtesy Lion was a mascot used for various public education campaigns in Singapore. It was created to educate the public on courtesy, graciousness and eventually kindness. A public education campaign featuring Singa the Lion was launched in 1982 under the National Courtesy Campaign with the slogan, "Courtesy is part of our tradition, it's so nice to be courteous."

From 2009, Singa the Lion has been adopted as the official mascot of the Singapore Kindness Movement.

Origins
Singa the Kindness Lion was initially created by a team of artists working under the then Ministry of Information & the Arts (MITA) - Now known as Ministry of Information, Communications and the Arts. The creation of Singa was overseen by Basskaran Nair, a civil servant, who headed the National Courtesy Campaign in its early years.

The team tasked with creating Singa consisted of chief artist Joseph Teo, Ahmad Asran and Eileen Wat. The team created Singa within a period of 6 weeks. The initial design of Singa was of a 'fierce-looking' lion and the subsequent revisions were overtly gentle in design.

The final version of Singa was only conceived after more than a hundred revisions. The final design depicts Singa as a golden lion with a bright and welcoming smile. Singa was introduced during a time where most campaigns were slogan driven. Singa's introduction paved the way for other mascots to be introduced into various public campaigns.

The Singapore Productivity campaign followed suit and adopted 'Teamy' the bee to address issues of productivity in the Singapore workforce.

Singa as popular character
Since its introduction, Singa has been made into a host of items ranging from badges, stickers, documentaries, jingles, songs, posters and banners, debates, contests, talks, exhibitions, courtesy courses, leaflets, handbooks and pamphlets. Singa soon became a familiar face with regular appearances in community events and advertisement campaigns.

The success of Singa the Kindness Lion was revealed in the Singa City exhibition held in 1987. Some 600,000 visitors visited the month-long exhibition held in Raffles City.

Additionally, Singa the Kindness Lion has been made into a popular board game of the 1980s, 'Courtesy Snakes And Ladders', in which discourteous animals will impede the progress of players through acts of discourtesy while landing on courteous animals.

Since being subsumed by the Singapore Kindness Movement, Singa has been revamped and reintroduced to the Singapore public in 2001. Singa the Kindness Lion has been incorporated in the Singapore Kindness Movement logo. Statues of Singa have been erected next to the Ministry of Information, Communications and the Arts building in Fort Canning Road.

Project Singa
Project Singa was launched in 2010 as a project to commemorate World Kindness Day. A series of 2.5 inch tall vinyl collectible figurines of Singa the Kindness Lion were created in collaboration with Singapore-based toy maker Play Imaginative and various local artists.

Additionally, a design contest was also held in which winning entries would be made into figurines. A total of 34 designs were designed and developed to promote messages of graciousness and kindness in society.

Present Singa
The courtesy lion of the 1970s and 80s has grown into the lion of kindness today. Till this date, Singa spends most of its time in schools, where it imparts values like graciousness and compassion to our primary school children and preschoolers. Singa also appears in the public as and when it is called upon to do so.

Singa Resigns was a campaign launched by the Singapore Kindness Movement in May 2013. The purpose of Singa's brief absence was to remind the public that kindness should not be dependent on the mascot to foster kindness and graciousness, but should be channelled through one's behaviour and responsibility.

In the present day, Singa can still be relied upon to help us achieve another public goal – a kind and gracious Singapore through public campaigns. In the new normal, the emphasis now shifts to Singaporeans, who are called upon to channel their inner Singa and spread kindness in a more intentional way.

Intellectual Property Rights 
The image of Singa the Kindness Lion and the word 'Singa' are the registered trademarks of the Singapore Kindness Movement. The use of the trademarks are subjected to conforming to the Singapore Copyright Act (Chapter 63) and has to be approved by the Singapore Kindness Movement.

References

External links
 Singapore Kindness Movement

Society of Singapore
History of Singapore
Singaporean culture
Cartoon mascots
Public service announcement characters
Lion mascots
Male characters in advertising